The women's football tournament at the 2016 Summer Olympics in Rio de Janeiro was held from 3 to 19 August 2016. The women's tournament was a full international tournament with no restrictions on age. The twelve national teams involved in the tournament were required to register a squad of 18 players, including two goalkeepers. Additionally, teams could name a maximum of four alternate players, numbered from 19 to 22. The alternate list could contain at most three outfielders, as at least one slot was reserved for a goalkeeper. In the event of serious injury during the tournament, an injured player could be replaced by one of the players in the alternate list. Only players in these squads were eligible to take part in the tournament.

The age listed for each player is on 3 August 2016, the first day of the tournament. The numbers of caps and goals listed for each player do not include any matches played after the start of the tournament. The club listed is the club for which the player last played a competitive match prior to the tournament. A flag is included for coaches who are of a different nationality than their own national team.

Group E

Brazil
Head coach: Vadão

Brazil named a squad of 18 players and 4 alternates for the tournament, which was announced on 12 July 2016.

China PR
Head coach:  Bruno Bini

China PR named a squad of 18 players and 4 alternates for the tournament, which was announced on 7 July 2016. Prior to the tournament, Ren Guixin withdrew injured and was replaced on 18 July 2016 by Li Ying, who was initially selected as an alternate player. Wang Yan subsequently filled the vacant alternate spot.

South Africa
Head coach:  Vera Pauw

South Africa named a squad of 18 players and 4 alternates for the tournament, which was announced on 14 July 2016. During the tournament, Thembi Kgatlana replaced Shiwe Nogwanya on 6 August 2016 due to injury.

Sweden
Head coach: Pia Sundhage

Sweden named a squad of 18 players and 4 alternates for the tournament, which was announced on 28 June 2016. During the tournament, Pauline Hammarlund replaced Fridolina Rolfö on 14 August 2016 due to injury.

Group F

Australia
Head coach: Alen Stajcic

Australia named a squad of 18 players and 4 alternates for the tournament, which was announced on 4 July 2016.

Canada
Head coach:  John Herdman

Canada named a squad of 18 players and 4 alternates for the tournament, which was announced on 20 June 2016.

Germany
Head coach: Silvia Neid

Germany named a squad of 18 players and 4 alternates for the tournament, which was announced on 15 July 2016. During the tournament, Svenja Huth replaced Simone Laudehr on 11 August 2016 due to injury.

Zimbabwe
Head coach: Shadreck Mlauzi

Zimbabwe named a squad of 18 players and 4 alternates for the tournament, which was announced on 22 July 2016.

Group G

Colombia
Head coach: Fabián Taborda

Colombia named a squad of 18 players and 4 alternates for the tournament, which was announced on 14 July 2016.

France
Head coach: Philippe Bergeroo

France named a squad of 18 players and 4 alternates for the tournament, which was announced on 7 July 2016. Prior to the tournament, Laura Georges withdrew injured and was replaced on 18 July 2016 by Sakina Karchaoui, who was initially selected as an alternate player. Sandie Toletti subsequently filled the vacant alternate spot.

New Zealand
Head coach:  Tony Readings

New Zealand named a squad of 18 players and 4 alternates for the tournament, which was announced on 4 July 2016.

United States
Head coach: Jill Ellis

The United States named a squad of 18 players and 4 alternates for the tournament, which was announced on 12 July 2016.

References

External links
 

Squads
2016
Lists of competitors at the 2016 Summer Olympics